Battle of Ba Dau (Vietnamese language: trận Ba Đầu or trận bến Ba Đầu) was in year 1128 between Đại Việt and Khmer Empire at a location of Nghệ An, the south of Đại Việt. Result of battle is the victory of Vietnamese, but Khmer empire come back in 8 August 1128, with other Khmer force.

References

12th century in Cambodia
History of Vietnam
Ba Dau
1128 in Asia